The Embassy of the Turkey in Brasília is Turkey's diplomatic mission to Brazil. It is located at Naçoes Avenue, Q.805, Brasília.

The current Turkish Chargé d'Affaires to Brazil is Ahmet Gürkan.

See also
List of Ambassadors from Turkey
Foreign relations of Turkey
Brazil–Turkey relations

External links 
 Turkish Embassy in Brasília

Brasilia
Turkey
Brazil–Turkey relations